The Camron climbing salamander (Bolitoglossa lignicolor), also known as the Camron mushroomtongue salamander or wood colored salamander, is a species of salamander in the family Plethodontidae.
It is found in Costa Rica and Panama.
Its natural habitat is subtropical or tropical moist lowland forests.
It is threatened by habitat loss.

References

Bolitoglossa
Taxonomy articles created by Polbot
Amphibians described in 1873
Taxa named by Wilhelm Peters